Chembai Vaidyanatha Bhagavatar a.k.a. Vaidyanatha Iyer (1 September 1896 – 16 October 1974) was a Carnatic music singer from Palakkad (state of Kerala, India). Known by his village name Chembai, or simply as Bhagavatar, he was born to Anantha Bhagavatar and Parvati Ammal in 1896, into a Tamil Brahmin family in Perakkool Madom (Parvati Ammal's birth home), adjacent to Lokanarkavu near Vatakara on Janmashtami day. He lived here until he was five years old. The family later shifted to Palakkad. Chembai was noted for his powerful voice and majestic style of singing. His first public performance was in 1904, when he was nine. A recipient of several titles and honours (including the Madras Music Academy's Sangeetha Kalanidhi in 1951), he was known for his encouragement of upcoming musicians and ability to spot new talent. He was responsible for popularising compositions like Rakshamam Saranagatam and Pavana Guru, among others. The music critic 'Aeolus' described him as "the musician who has meant the most to Carnatic Music in the first fifty years of the 20th century." His prominent disciples include Chembai Narayana Bhagavathar, Mangu Thampuran, Guruvayur Ponnammal, T. V. Gopalakrishnan, V. V. Subramaniam, P. Leela, K. G. Jayan, K. G. Vijayan, K. J. Yesudas, Kudumaru Venkataraman and Babu Parameswaran, among others. He also mentored many young accompanists, including Palghat Mani Iyer, Lalgudi Jayaraman, M. S. Gopalakrishnan, T. N. Krishnan, Palani Subramaniam Pillai and L. Subramaniam. Memorial music festivals have been held in his honour annually since his death in 1974, the most important being the annually celebrated Chembai Sangeetholsavam.

Early life

The family's connection with classical music spans five centuries. Vaidyanatha Bhagavatar's father, Anantha Bhagavatar, was a violinist and singer from Chembai, near Palakkad, to whom a local Maharaja awarded the title "Ghana Chakratanam", indicating his mastery of a special closed-mouth style of singing tanam. At age 3, Chembai began to learn Carnatic music from his father in the customary guru-sishya tradition, and also began violin and flute training in 1912. Chembai is also one of 12 names of Sirkazhi, the birthplace of Saint Gnanasambandar 7th century CE in Tamil Nadu.

Singing career
Some of the noteworthy early events that helped shape Chembai's career include his arangetram (debut concert) in Ottapalam in 1904, performances at Vaikom and Guruvayur in 1907, his year with Kaliakudi Natesa Sastry (1909) and the accolades he received from Palghat Anantharama Bhagavatar (1911). Between 1913 and 1927, he performed at many different music festivals and sabhas, notably including the Madras Music Academy and the often forgotten Jagannatha Bhakta Sabha. 

Chembai in 1952 he had lost his voice and couldn’t chant the name of his favourite deity, Guruvayurappan. He prayed fervently and apparently his prayers were answered when a stranger gave treatment to his voice for 18 days in Poomallianmana in Kerala at the residence of Nilakantan Namboodripad. He came around and was able to sing with increased vigour. Since then, he donated the majority of his earnings to Guruvayoor temple.

Release of recordings
Chembai has many phonograph recordings to his credit, recorded from 1932 to 1946. Those were the days before the advent of the concert microphone, and a singer was entirely dependent on the timbre and reach of his voice for a successful concert. Chembai was blessed with a voice of great depth. Further, the perception that Chembai's repertoire of songs was limited is highly incorrect. The number of different compositions he recorded is in the hundreds (let alone the total number he performed in concerts and on radio during his career).

Lalita Dasar Kritis (1945)
Chembai's old friend, T. G. Krishna Iyer, from Tripunithura, had settled in Madras (now Chennai) and offered a house to Chembai on Palace Road near Santhome. He had composed some 155 kritis in Telugu, Malayalam, Tamil and Sanskrit under the mudra 'Lalita dasar' and requested Chembai to popularise them. Chembai set the kritis to classical music and got them published under the name Lalita Dasar Keertanaigal. He made it a practice to sing these kritis in most of his concerts. He also released a record containing selected kritis from Lalita Dasar's kritis like Evariki Telusunamma (Dhanyasi), Ennil Kaninda (Shankarabharanam), Pavana Guru (Hamsanandi), Varijadala Lochani (Arabhi), among others.

Performing ability and style
Chembai  had  a  vigorous,  strong,  vibrant,  ringing  and  resonant  voice. He would sing in a clear, open-throated style that requires high levels of physical and mental endurance to pull off, yet, he did so in a seemingly effortless manner. He had a wonderful sense of accurate kala pramana (time measure). He could do a niraval and swaraprastara from any given point, which bespoke of mental alertness in a concert. His empathy for his accompanists and disciples was noteworthy and he would go to great lengths to encourage them.

Other stalwarts have admired the strengths in Chembai's singing. For instance, upon witnessing that Chembai was able to sing three major concerts in a single day, Sangeetha Kalanidhi G. N. Balasubramaniam is said to have remarked "These are not ordinary men. These are the Asuras of the music field.  If I sing one concert, I need to rest the whole of next day". Legendary percussionist Pudukkottai Dakshinamurthy Pillai would call him "Laya Brahma" for his impeccable grasp of tala and laya. Sangeetha Kalanidhi K. V. Narayanaswamy has also remarked on Chembai's ability to hold notes aligned perfectly to sruti for extended intervals of time.

Disciples
Chembai had many students, including K. J. Yesudas and many noted musicians like Sangeetha Kalanidhi T. V. Gopalakrishnan, P. Leela, and the Jaya-Vijaya twins, Kudumaru Venkataraman, Paramasivan Bhagavathar and others.

Death
Chembai died suddenly on 16 October 1974, aged 78, of a cardiac arrest. Shortly before that, he performed his last concert at Poozhikkunnu Sreekrishna temple in Ottapalam (the venue of his first concert), and concluded the concert with his favourite song "Karuna Cheivan Endu Thamasam Krishna" (Why is there so much delay in conferring your mercy, Krishna?). He was talking to his disciple Olappamanna Vasudevan Namboothiripad when he suddenly collapsed and died. His nephew said he had always spoken about an easy death, and had attained it. He was cremated in his birth village. He was survived by his wife and daughter, both of them who died later. The Govt. Musical College in Palakkad was renamed as 'Chembai Memorial Govt' Musical College' in his memory.

Awards and titles

Chembai received several awards and titles during his career, most notably including:

 "Gayana Gandharva" (a title bestowed by Kalki Krishnamurthy in 1940)
 Sangeetha Kalanidhi (1951; highest accolade in Carnatic music)
 Sangeet Natak Akademi Award (1958)
 Sangeetha Kalasikhamani (1964; by The Fine Arts Society, Chennai)
 Kerala Sangeetha Nataka Akademi Fellowship (1972)
 Padma Bhushan (1973) – The Padma Bhushan is a national award bestowed by the President of India on select musicians and other eminent people. Chembai was selected to receive the award in 1973 from the then president V. V. Giri.
 The Department of Posts, Govt of India released a special issue stamp in Chembai's birth centenary year (1996).

Music festivals

Chembai had been conducting a music festival in his native village from 1924 onwards. This was continued by his family and now by Chembai Sreenivasan and Chembai Suresh (C. A. Subramanian). The concert, called Chembai Ekadasi Music Festival, is held annually in February–March. Chembai also held a music festival on Guruvayur Ekadasi Day (mid-November) at Guruvayur every year. This festival, now called Chembai Sangeetholsavam in his honour, is officially conducted by the Guruvayur Devaswom Board.

Guruvayurappan Chembai Puraskaram
The Sri Guvayurappan Chembai Puraskaram, awarded by Sree Krishna Temple, Guruvayur, is instituted in Chembai's memory of the late Chembai Vaidyanatha Bhagavathar. This award, comprising a cash prize of INR 50,001, a gold locket of Sree Guruvayurappan, a citation and ponnadai, is usually presented during the annual Chembai Music Festival.

The recipients of the Chembai puraskaram include:
Saxophonist Kadri Gopalnath (2013)
Carnatic musician Trichur V. Ramachandran
Veena maestro A. Ananthapadmanabhan (2011)
Carnatic musician K. G. Jayan (2010)
Carnatic vocalist Parassala Ponnammal (2009)
Mridangam maestro Mavelikkara Velukkutty Nair (2008)
Carnatic vocalist M. Balamuralikrishna (2007)
Violin maestro M. S. Gopalakrishnan (2006)
Carnatic musician and mridangam maestro T V Gopalakrishnan (2005)

See also
Carnatic music
List of Carnatic singers

References

External links

http://chembai.com
https://web.archive.org/web/20060610105948/http://chembaismruthi.org/
https://web.archive.org/web/20070104210611/http://www.cmana.org/cmana/articles/gmcm.htm
 accompanied by Chowdiah on the violin and Palghat Mani Iyer on the Mridangam

 
Male Carnatic singers
Carnatic singers
Carnatic instrumentalists
Recipients of the Padma Bhushan in arts
Recipients of the Sangeet Natak Akademi Award
Sangeetha Kalanidhi recipients
1896 births
1974 deaths
People from Palakkad district
Singers from Kerala
20th-century Indian male classical singers
Recipients of the Kerala Sangeetha Nataka Akademi Fellowship